Non-tariff barriers to trade (NTBs; also called non-tariff measures, NTMs) are trade barriers that restrict imports or exports of goods or services through mechanisms other than the simple imposition of tariffs.

The Southern African Development Community (SADC) defines a non-tariff barrier as "any obstacle to international trade that is not an import or export duty. They may take the form of import quotas, subsidies, customs delays, technical barriers, or other systems preventing or impeding trade". According to the World Trade Organization, non-tariff barriers to trade include import licensing, rules for valuation of goods at customs, pre-shipment inspections, rules of origin ('made in'), and trade prepared investment measures. A 2019 UNCTAD report concluded that trade costs associated with non-tariff measures were more than double those of traditional tariffs.

History

The transition from tariffs to non-tariff barriers

One of the reasons why industrialized countries have moved from tariffs to NTBs is the fact that developed countries have sources of income other than tariffs. Historically, in the formation of nation-states, governments had to get funding. They received it through the introduction of tariffs. This explains the fact that most developing countries still rely on tariffs as a way to finance their spending. Developed countries can afford not to depend on tariffs, at the same time developing NTBs as a possible way of international trade regulation. The second reason for the transition to NTBs is that these barriers can be used to support weak industries or compensation of industries which have been affected negatively by the reduction of tariffs. The third reason for the popularity of NTBs is the ability of interest groups to influence the process in the absence of opportunities to obtain government support for the tariffs.

Non-tariff barriers today

With the exception of export subsidies and quotas, NTBs are most similar to the tariffs. Tariffs for goods production were reduced during the eight rounds of negotiations in the WTO and the General Agreement on Tariffs and Trade (GATT). After lowering of tariffs, the principle of protectionism demanded the introduction of new NTBs such as technical barriers to trade (TBT). According to statements made at United Nations Conference on Trade and Development (UNCTAD, 2005), the use of NTBs, based on the amount and control of price levels has decreased significantly from 45% in 1994 to 15% in 2004, while use of other NTBs increased from 55% in 1994 to 85% in 2004.

Increasing consumer demand for safe and environment friendly products also have had their impact on increasing popularity of TBT. Many NTBs are governed by WTO agreements, which originated in the Uruguay Round (the TBT Agreement, SPS Measures Agreement, the Agreement on Textiles and Clothing), as well as GATT articles. NTBs in the field of services have become as important as in the field of trade in goods.

Most of the NTB can be defined as protectionist measures, unless they are related to difficulties in the market, such as externalities and information asymmetries between consumers and producers of goods. An example of this is safety standards and labeling requirements.

The need to protect sensitive to import industries, as well as a wide range of trade restrictions, available to the governments of industrialized countries, forcing them to resort to use the NTB, and putting serious obstacles to international trade and world economic growth. Thus, NTBs can be referred as a new form of protection which has replaced tariffs as an old form of protection.

Types of Non-Tariff Barriers
Professor Alan Deardorff characterises NTB policies under three headings: Purposes, Examples, and Consequences

There are several different variants of the division or classification of non-tariff barriers. Some scholars divide them between internal taxes, administrative barriers, health and sanitary regulations and government procurement policies. Others divide them into more categories such as specific limitations on trade, customs and administrative entry procedures, standards, government participation in trade, charges on import, and other categories.

The first category includes methods to directly import restrictions for protection of certain sectors of national industries: licensing and allocation of import quotas, antidumping and countervailing duties, import deposits, so-called voluntary export restraints, countervailing duties, the system of minimum import prices, etc. Under second category follow methods that are not directly aimed at restricting foreign trade and more related to the administrative bureaucracy, whose actions, however, restrict trade, for example: customs procedures, technical standards and norms, sanitary and veterinary standards, requirements for labeling and packaging, bottling, etc. The third category consists of methods that are not directly aimed at restricting the import or promoting the export, but the effects of which often lead to this result.

The non-tariff barriers can include wide variety of restrictions to trade.

Examples of common NTBs

Administrative and bureaucratic delays at the border

Among the methods of non-tariff regulation should be mentioned administrative and bureaucratic delays at the border, which increase uncertainty and the cost of maintaining inventory. For example, even though Turkey is in a (partial) customs union with the EU, transport of Turkish goods to the European Union is subject to extensive administrative overheads that Turkey estimates cost it three billion euros a year.

Censorship
Testifying before the United States Senate Committee on Finance, Subcommittee on International Trade, Customs, and Global Competitiveness on "censorship as a non-tariff barrier" in 2020, Richard Gere stated that economic interest compel studios to avoid social and political issues Hollywood once addressed, "Imagine Marty Scorsese's Kundun, about the life of the Dalai Lama, or my own film Red Corner, which is highly critical of the Chinese legal system. Imagine them being made today. It wouldn't happen."

Embargoes 

Embargoes are outright prohibition of trade in certain commodities.  As well as quotas, embargoes may be imposed on imports or exports of particular goods in respect of certain goods supplied to or from specific countries, or in respect of all goods shipped to certain countries. Although an embargo may be imposed for biosecurity reasons, more often the reasons are political (see economic sanctions and international sanctions). Embargoes are generally considered legal barriers to trade, not to be confused with blockades, which are often considered to be acts of war.

Foreign exchange restrictions and foreign exchange controls 

Foreign exchange restrictions and foreign exchange controls occupy an important place among the non-tariff regulatory instruments of foreign economic activity. Foreign exchange restrictions constitute the management of transactions between national and foreign operators, either by limiting the supply of foreign currency (to restrict imports) or by state manipulation of exchange rates (to boost exports and limit imports).

Import deposits 
Another example of foreign trade regulations is import deposits. Import deposits is a form of deposit, which the importer must pay the central bank for a definite period of time (non-interest bearing deposit) in an amount equal to all or part of the cost of imported goods.

Administrative regulation of capital movements
At the national level, administrative regulation of capital movements between states is carried out mainly within a framework of bilateral agreements, which include a clear definition of the legal regime, the procedure for the admission of investments and investors. It is determined by mode (fair and equitable, national, 'most favoured nation'), order of nationalization and compensation, transfer profits and capital repatriation and dispute resolution.

Licenses 
The most common instruments of direct regulation of imports (and sometimes export) are licenses and quotas. Almost all industrialized countries apply these non-tariff methods. The license system requires that a state (through specially authorized office) issues permits for foreign trade transactions of import and export commodities included in the lists of licensed merchandises. Product licensing can take many forms and procedures. The main types of licenses are general license that permits unrestricted importation or exportation of goods included in the lists for a certain period of time; and one-time license for a certain product importer (exporter) to import (or export). One-time license indicates a quantity of goods, its cost, its country of origin (or destination), and in some cases also customs point through which import (or export) of goods should be carried out. The use of licensing systems as an instrument for foreign trade regulation is based on a number of international level standards agreements. In particular, these agreements include some provisions of the General Agreement on Tariffs and Trade (GATT) / World Trade Organization (WTO) such as the Agreement on Import Licensing Procedures.

Localization requirement 
An importing country may require the prospective exporter to include a degree of local participation in the product or service. Options include a designated importer, a joint-venture company with majority local control, requirement for complete local manufacture which may imply transfer of intellectual property. The WTO has not reached a conclusion on the legitimacy of these measures.

Standards

Standards take a special place among non-tariff barriers. Countries usually impose standards on classification, labelling and testing of products to ensure that domestic products meet domestic standards, but also to restrict sales of products of foreign manufacture unless they meet or exceed these same standards. These standards are sometimes entered to protect the safety and health of local populations and the natural environment.

Quotas

Licensing of foreign trade is closely related to quantitative restrictions – quotas – on imports and exports of certain goods. A quota is a limitation in value or in physical terms, imposed on import and export of certain goods for a certain period of time. This category includes global quotas with respect to specific countries, seasonal quotas, and so-called "voluntary export restraints". Quantitative controls on foreign trade transactions are carried out through one-time license.

Quantitative restrictions on imports and exports are direct administrative forms of government regulation of foreign trade. Licenses and quotas limit the independence of enterprises with a regard to entering foreign markets, narrowing the range of countries in which firms can conduct trade for certain commodities.  They regulate the range and number of goods permitted for import and export.

However, the system of licensing and quota imports and exports, establishing firm control over foreign trade in certain goods, in many cases turns out to be more flexible and effective than economic instruments of foreign trade regulation. This can be explained by the fact that licensing and quota systems are an important instrument of trade regulation of the vast majority of the world.

This type of trade barrier normally leads to increased costs and limited selection of goods for consumers and higher import prices for companies. Import quotas can be unilateral, levied by the country without negotiations with exporting country; or bilateral or multilateral, when they are imposed after negotiations and agreements.

An export quota is a limit on the amount of goods that can be exported from a country. There are different reasons for imposing export quotas from a country.  These reasons include guaranteeing of the supply of the products that are in shortage in the domestic market, manipulation of the prices on the international level, and the control of goods strategically important for the country. In some cases, the importing countries request exporting countries to impose voluntary export restraints.

Agreement on a "voluntary" export restraint
In the past decade, a widespread practice of concluding agreements on the "voluntary" export restrictions and the establishment of import minimum prices imposed by leading Western nations upon exporters that are weaker in an economical or political sense. These types of restrictions involve the establishment of unconventional techniques when trade barriers are introduced at the border of the exporting country instead of the importing country.

Thus, the agreement on "voluntary" export restraints is imposed by the exporter under the threat of sanctions to limit the export of certain goods to the importing country. Similarly, the establishment of minimum import prices should be strictly observed by the exporting firms in contracts with the importers of the country that has set such prices. In the case of reduction of export prices below the minimum level, the importing country imposes anti-dumping duty, which could lead to withdrawal from the market. “Voluntary" export agreements affect trade in textiles, footwear, dairy products, consumer electronics, cars, machine tools, etc.

Problems arise when the quotas are distributed between countries because it is necessary to ensure that products from one country are not diverted in violation of quotas set out in second country. Import quotas are not necessarily designed to protect domestic producers. For example, Japan maintains quotas on many agricultural products it does not produce. Quotas on imports are used as leverage when negotiating the sales of Japanese exports, as well as avoiding excessive dependence on any other country with respect to necessary food; the supplies of which could decrease in case of bad weather or political conditions.

Export quotas can be set in order to provide domestic consumers with sufficient stocks of goods at low prices, to prevent the depletion of natural resources, as well as to increase export prices by restricting supply to foreign markets. Such restrictions (through agreements on various types of goods) allow producing countries to use quotas for such commodities as coffee and oil; as the result, prices for these products increased in importing countries.

A quota can be a tariff rate quota, global quota, discriminating quota, and export quota.

Scarcity of information
The scarcity of information on non-tariff barriers is a major problem to the competitiveness of developing countries. As a result, the International Trade Centre conducted national surveys and began publishing a series of technical papers on non-tariff barriers faced in developing countries. By 2015 it launched the NTM Business Surveys website listing non-tariff barriers from company perspectives.

See also
 Arms embargo
 Arms Export Control Act (United States)
 Economic sanctions
 Non-violation nullification of benefits
 Trade Facilitation and Development

References

Further reading

External links
 Understanding non-tariff obstacles to trade: The Business Perspective (2016) A series of technical papers based on large-scale company surveys in developing countries to improve knowledge of NTM barriers. (International Trade Centre)
 Market Access Map, an online database of customs tariffs and market requirements. (International Trade Centre)
 Integrated Trade Intelligence Portal I-TIP provides statistical and detailed information on non-tariff measures notified by WTO members. (World Trade Organization)
 Trade Monitoring Database provides information on trade measures taken by WTO members and observers since October 2008. (World Trade Organization)
 Non-tariff barriers: red tape, etc. (World Trade Organization)
 World Integrated Trade Solution (WITS) provides access to trade, tariff and non-tariff data. (World Bank and UNCTAD)
NTM Indicator by country (World Bank)
NTM Data Visualizations (World Bank)
 What happens after trade agreements? (Overseas Development Institute)
 Trade Costs and Facilitation: The Development Dimension, the main World Bank project on trade facilitation, economic growth and development. (World Bank)
 Agritrade website for ACP-EU agriculture and fisheries trade issues. (CTA: Technical Centre for Agricultural and Rural Co-operation)
 Non Tariff Barriers reporting, monitoring and elimination mechanism, where private sector enterprises can file complaints on a specific trade obstacles. (African Continental Free Trade Area).
 Classification of non-tariff measures
 
 Country Data on non-tariff measures
 Official sources of data on non-tariff measures 

 
Commercial policy
World Trade Organization